Anthony Small (born 19 April 1936) is a New Zealand cricketer. He played in one first-class match for Central Districts in 1955/56.

See also
 List of Central Districts representative cricketers

References

External links
 

1936 births
Living people
Central Districts cricketers
Cricketers from Dannevirke
New Zealand cricketers